Back Home is the eighth studio album by Irish boy band Westlife, released on 5 November 2007 through Syco Music, Sony Music and RCA Records, the band's ninth major album release under them as well. The album was produced by Steve Mac, Quiz & Larossi, Per Magnusson, David Kreuger and Rami Yacoub, who also produced some of the group's previous material. Back Home was the group's final album before their temporary break from music in 2008. It was also the band's fourth album to be released as a four-piece.

The album was preceded by the lead single "Home", a cover version of the Michael Bublé song, which was sent to radio stations in September 2007, and was eventually released as a digital download and CD single on 29 October 2007. Two more singles were released to promote the album, namely "Us Against the World" and "Something Right". A DVD also accompanied the album's release, including some of the group's recent music videos and exclusive footage of the group.

The album was met with mixed reviews, however the album was a commercial success. The album debuted atop the UK Albums Chart, selling 132,000 copies in its first week of release and remained in the top three spots for eight consecutive weeks. It also spent five weeks at number two. One of those weeks have the highest sales for a number two in a week of the year 2007 in the United Kingdom. While in Ireland, this is the third best-selling album of 2007.

Background
The track listing for the album was released on the band's official website on 3 October 2007, with track-by-track videos by the band. The release date of the album was brought forward to 5 November 2007 from the initial 12 November 2007. The album contains a collection of brand new tracks along with a few covers. The cover songs on the album are "Have You Ever?", a Diane Warren penned ballad previously recorded by Brandy, and "I'm Already There", a song recorded by Lonestar.
The first single from the album is a cover of the ballad "Home", originally by Michael Bublé, and was released on 29 October 2007 The song debuted at number three on the UK Singles Chart. "Us Against the World", an original song dedicated to Westlife fans worldwide, was released as the band's second single on 3 March 2008 in the UK and Ireland. Meanwhile, "Something Right", which is an original up-tempo song, was released as the third single in Asia and Europe. When Westlife announced the release date for the album, the Spice Girls immediately withdrew from the chart battle and delayed their Greatest Hits album release by a week to 12 November 2007. Westlife and the Spice Girls were then engaged in a war of words where each accused the other party of avoiding each other's release. The Spice Girls claimed that their album was to be released on 12 November 2007 and that this has always been the case. However, music retailers revealed that the Spice Girls' album was initially marked with a 5 November 2007 release date.

An accompanying DVD was released on the week of the album's release. It featured backstage footage of the group, Up Close and Personal segments, and the music videos of "Home", "You Raise Me Up", "When You Tell Me That You Love Me", "Amazing" and "The Rose". The DVD was available exclusively at Woolworths. It charted at number one on the UK Visuals Chart and was certified Platinum.

Track listing

 "Something Right" is also referred to as "Something's Right".
 "I'm Already There" is also referred to as "Already There".
 "The Easy Way" is also referred to as "Easy Way".
 "I Do" is also referred to as "I Do (The Best Is Yet to Come)".

Credits

*Numbers in brackets represents the track number on the album.

Charts

Weekly charts

Year-end charts

Certifications and sales

Release history

References

2007 albums
Westlife albums
Albums produced by Rami Yacoub
Albums produced by Steve Mac
Albums produced by Per Magnusson
Albums produced by David Kreuger
Sony BMG albums
RCA Records albums